Independence Paragliding is a German aircraft manufacturer based in Eisenberg, Bavaria and founded by designer Michaël Nesler and test pilot Christian Amon. The company is a division of Fly-Market Flugsport-Zubehör GmbH & Co. KG and specializes in the design and manufacture of paragliders in the form of ready-to-fly aircraft as well as reserve parachutes, harnesses and paragliding accessories.

The company's line of aircraft in the mid-2000s included the Akron intermediate glider, the Avalon beginner glider and the Dragon intermediate. The competition glider of that period, the Raptor, was sold at a discounted price to support competition pilots. The company also sold a two-place glider for flight training, the Speed Tandem.

Aircraft 

Summary of aircraft built by Independence Paragliding:
Independence Air Taxi
Independence Akron
Independence Avalon
Independence Cruiser
Independence Draco
Independence Dragon
Independence Duett
Independence Duke
Independence Excalibur
Independence Galaxy
Independence Garuda
Independence Grasshopper
Independence Geronimo
Independence Groundhandling Trainer
Independence Merlin
Independence Mountain
Independence Pioneer
Independence Raptor
Independence Speed
Independence Speed Tandem
Independence Sportster
Independence Striker
Independence Tensing
Independence T-Fighter
Independence Trainer
Independence Voyager
Independence Zippy PT

References

External links

Aircraft manufacturers of Germany
Paragliders